Île Australia, also known as Île aux Rennes (Reindeer Island) due to the presence of (introduced) reindeer is one of the Kerguelen Islands situated in the Golfe du Morbihan near the coast of Grande Terre, the principal island.

It is around 10 km long and 3 km wide. The highest spot is Le stack de Tome at 145 metres.

References
 

Australia